Odontadenia macrantha is a vine of the family Apocynaceae native to Central and South America.

The cylindrical stem is either woody or just woody at the base. They are oppositely arranged on the stem. However, flower shape and colour can vary considerably.

It was originally described as Echites macrantha by Austrian botanists Johann Jacob Roemer and Josef August Schultes in 1819 from material from Brazil. The species name is derived from the Ancient Greek words makros "long" and anther "flower(ing)". George Bentham described it as Odontadenia speciosa in 1841 from material collected from Guyana in 1837. It is the type species of the genus. Odontadenia caudigera was described by Ann Woodson in 1936 from a collection from Belize. Also found in Nicaragua and Costa Rica, this was considered a separate species on account of its smaller and differently shaped corolla, but intermediate flowers have been found on the same plant so is regarded as conspecific.  Odontadenia sylvestris, described by Brazil as distinct on a similar basis, is also regarded as a variant of O. macrantha.

Odontadenia macrantha is native to Central and South America, from Guatemala in the north to Brazil in the south, as well as the West Indies, from sea level to  elevation.

It is occasionally cultivated in Singapore.

References

Flora of Oaxaca
Odontadenieae
Plants described in 1819
Flora of Brazil
Flora of Guatemala
Flora of Guyana